HMS Magdala was a  breastwork monitor of the Royal Navy, built specifically to serve as a coastal defence ship for the harbour of Bombay (now Mumbai) in the late 1860s. She was ordered by the India Office for the Bombay Marine. The original specifications were thought to be too expensive and a cheaper design was ordered. While limited to harbour defence duties, the breastwork monitors were described by Admiral George Alexander Ballard as being like "full-armoured knights riding on donkeys, easy to avoid but bad to close with." Aside from gunnery practice Magdala remained in Bombay Harbour for her entire career. The ship was sold for scrap in 1903.

Design and description 
In July 1866 the India Office asked for two floating batteries to defend Bombay and the Controller of the Navy, Vice Admiral Spencer Robinson recommended that monitors be used. He recommended a design with  armour belt and  protecting the gun turret, armed with the largest possible guns, which would cost £220,000. The India Office thought that this was too expensive and ordered a repeat of  instead for only £132,400.

They displaced . Their crew consisted of 155 officers and men.

Propulsion
Magdala had two horizontal direct-acting steam engines, made by Ravenhill, each driving a single propeller.

Armament
The Cerberus-class ships mounted a pair of 10-inch rifled muzzle-loading guns in each hand-worked turret. The guns could fire both solid shot and explosive shells. Magdala was rearmed in 1892 with four breech-loading BL 8-inch guns.

Armour

Service
HMS Magdala was laid down on 6 October 1868 by the Thames Ironworks in Leamouth, London. She was launched on 2 March 1870 and completed in November 1870. For her delivery voyage to India, Magdala was fitted with three temporary masts and made the trip under sail in the middle of winter without escort, as both her builders and the Royal Navy, considered her sufficiently seaworthy as to make the trip safely. Her life thereafter was wholly spent in Bombay Harbour, with occasional short trips to sea for firing practice. She was sold for scrap in January 1903.

Notes

References

External links
Magdala & Abyssinia Slideshow

 

Cerberus-class monitors
Ships built in Leamouth
1870 ships
Victorian-era monitors of the United Kingdom